Jennifer Bisset (born 28 January 1992 in Newcastle, New South Wales) is an Australian football (soccer) player who plays for Western Sydney Wanderers in the Australian W-League. During the 2013 off-season she played for Pallokerho-35 in Finland's Naistenliiga.

In October 2017, Bisset joined Western Sydney Wanderers for the 2017–18 W-League season.

She is also a journalist and film critic for CNET.

References

Australian women's soccer players
Canberra United FC players
Western Sydney Wanderers FC (A-League Women) players
A-League Women players
1992 births
Living people
Women's association football midfielders